Thomas de Charlton was Archdeacon of Totnes during 1302.

References

Archdeacons of Totnes